Theo Brown (16 December 1914 – 3 February 1993) was a British scholar of Devon folklore. She was lecturer in Comparative Religion at Exeter University.

Biography
Theo Brown was born Jean Marion Pryce in London. Her mother died in childbirth. Her father – a scholar, who was later to become Keeper of Classical Antiquities at the British Museum – was unable to look after her, and put her into an orphanage. She was adopted by Dorothy Langford Brown, of Barton Hall, Kingskerswell, Devon, and renamed Theodora Brown.

Brown studied at Westminster School of Art, where she was taught by Mervyn Peake among others, and where she met her lifelong friend, Margaret Matcham. She joined the Kenn group of artists.

During the Second World War she joined the Women's Royal Naval Service but as her mother insisted she remain near to home, her time was spent in home defence duties. When joining the Wrens she had to produce a birth certificate, and so found out about her adoption – something which caused her much distress at the time.

After the war, depressed and alone, she chanced to meet W. F. Jackson Knight in the station café of Exeter Central railway station. (This meeting is engagingly described in Jackson Knights Biography). He had a profound influence on her life thereafter, turning her to studies of Folklore and Comparative Religion, subjects in which she eventually became Lecturer at Exeter University. She was a significant member of the school of folklorists who were influenced by Jungian psychology, and believed that it was possible to identify in folklore the abiding archetypes of the collective unconscious. She gathered a large collection of stories and traditions, which are now deposited at the Devon and Exeter Institution, and her notes and unpublished work at the Exeter University Library.

Brown died in Exeter on 3 February 1993.

Works 

Selected publications

 1954 The Dartmoor Legend of Mrs. Childe. Folklore 65, 103-9.
 1958 The Black Dog. Folklore 69, 175-192.
1961 Tales of a Dartmoor Village. Some preliminary notes on the folklore of Postbridge. West Country Folklore No. 7. St. Peter Port, Guernsey.
Reprinted from Transactions of the Devonshire Association XCIII (1961) 194-227].
1964 Living Images, Folklore 73, 25-40.
1968 (with Stephen Dewar) Ghostly Gold and Goblin Titles. West Country Folklore No. 2. St. Peter Port, Guernsey.
1970a Trojans in the West Country, West Country Folklore No. 4. St. Peter Port, Guernsey.
1970b Charming in Devon. Folklore 81, 19-47.
1975 West Country Entrances to the Underworld, in The Journey to the Other World, H.R.E. Davidson ed., Mistletoe Series No. 12. Folklore Society, London.
1978 The Black Dog in English Folklore,' in Animals in Folklore. J.R. Porter and W.M.S. Russell, eds. Mistletoe Series No. 9. Folklore Society, London.
1979 The Fate of the Dead: A Study in Folk Eschatology in the West Country after the Reformation. Mistletoe Series No. 12. Folklore Society, London.
1981 The Ghost of Old Mrs Leakey, in The Folklore of Ghosts, H.R.E. Davidson and W.M.S. Russell, eds., Mistletoe Series No. 15, Folklore Society, London.
1982 Devon Ghosts. Norwich.

References

External links  
 The Folklore of Devon 
 Theo Brown papers at University of Exeter library 
 The Theo Brown collection
 Theo Brown woodcuts

1914 births
1993 deaths
Devon folklore
English folklorists
Academics of the University of Exeter
Alumni of the Westminster School of Art
Scientists from London
Women in World War II